The Chinese census, officially the National Population Census of the People's Republic of China, is the national census of the People's Republic of China.

It has been carried out seven times in the history of the People's Republic of China.
1953: First National Population Census of the People's Republic of China
1964: Second National Population Census of the People's Republic of China
1982: Third National Population Census of the People's Republic of China
1990: Fourth National Population Census of the People's Republic of China
2000: Fifth National Population Census of the People's Republic of China
2010: Sixth National Population Census of the People's Republic of China
2020: Seventh National Population Census of the People's Republic of China

See also
China microcensus
National Bureau of Statistics of China

Censuses
Demography
Censuses in China